Lambya (Rambia) is a Bantu language of Tanzania and Malawi. In Northern Malawi it is spoken particularly in the Chitipa District.

Sukwa, once thought to be a dialect of Nyakyusa, is now considered to be a dialect of Lambya. The University of Malawi Language Mapping Survey for Northern Malawi (2006), agreeing with this, found that the three languages Cilambya, Cindali, and Cisukwa form a single dialect group, although there are differences between them, especially between Cilambya and the other two. The examples below come in the order Lambya, Ndali, Sukwa:

An example of Lambya
The Language Mapping Survey gives further vocabulary and also a short text (the Tortoise and the Hare) in all three dialects. The Lambya version of the story goes as follows:

 (Lambia)
 

 

 

The story may be translated as follows:

In the village there was a famine. So Tortoise went to beg food from people. When they gave him that food he wasn't able to carry it because he was short. For this reason he tied a sack to a very long rope and wore it round his neck. As he was walking along that sack was following behind him.

As he was going to his home, Hare was coming behind him. When he saw that sack he said, "I've found it, my sack!" Tortoise said, "Hare, this sack is mine! See this rope I've tied to my neck so that when walking I can pull it." Hare denied it saying, "It's better we go to the chief so that he can decide." When Hare said this, they went to that chief. That chief judged that they should cut Tortoise's rope and take the sack and give it to Hare.

Another day, when Hare was walking, Tortoise came behind him. He said: "I've found it, my tail!" Hare said, "Nonsense! The tail isn't yours, it's mine!" Tortoise denied it saying, "I found it, it's mine." Since this was the situation, they both decided that they should go to the chief so that he could decide. At the chief's the case went in favour of Tortoise. The chief decided that they should cut off Hare's tail and give it to Tortoise.

Further reading
Mtenje, Atikonda (2016). A comparative analysis of the Phonology and Morpho-syntax of Cisukwa, Cindali and Cilambya. (University of Cape Town PhD thesis)

References

External links

Language Mapping Survey for Northern Malawi. University of Malawi Centre for Language Studies, 2006.
Language Map of Northern Malawi
Paper by Martin Walsh and Imani Swilla on South-West Tanzanian languages (2002)

Rukwa languages
Languages of Malawi
Languages of Tanzania